Jean Fourastié (15 April 1907 in Saint-Benin-d'Azy, Nièvre - 25 July 1990 in Douelle, Lot) was a French civil servant, economist, professor and public intellectual. He coined the expression Trente Glorieuses ("the glorious thirty [years]") to describe the period of prosperity that France experienced from the end of World War II until the 1973 oil crisis.

Biography

Jean Fourastié received his elementary and secondary education at the private Catholic College of Juilly from 1914 to 1925. Then in Paris, he boarded at École Massillon and enrolled in classe préparatoire aux grandes écoles at Lycée Saint-Louis. He was admitted into École Centrale Paris, from which he graduated in 1930, but was not attracted by an engineering career. He received a law degree in 1933, followed by doctor of law In 1937 with a thesis on insurance supervision.

In 1932, Fourastié successfully passed the examination to become an insurance supervisor for the French state. He would stay in the civil service until 1951.

During World War II, Fourastié kept working for the state under Vichy France, while keeping distance from direct collaboration with Germany's Nazi regime. In January 1941, he started giving a course on insurance at the Conservatoire National des Arts et Métiers (CNAM), replacing his ministry colleague Maxime Malinski who was Jewish and thus had been victim of the 1940 Vichy anti-Jewish legislation. Fourastié's course met instant success with CNAM students. He also taught general accounting at École Libre des Sciences Politiques between 1941 and 1943. In 1941 and 1943, he participated in the committee chaired by Auguste Detœuf that created France's General Accounting Framework, itself largely modeled on the German accounting framework of 1937 championed by Hermann Göring. In September-October 1944, the ad hoc body that investigated acts of collaboration cleared Fourastié of any charges, following a process in which Malinski defended Fourastié's innocence. 

Fourastié then taught at the newly created École nationale d'administration and played an enhanced role in the renewed  committee chaired from 1946 by Robert Lacoste. In 1945, Jean Monnet hired him to serve as an economic advisor on the Commissariat général du Plan, serving the country's economic reconstruction under the direct authority of the Prime Minister of France.  He served four terms as president of the workforce modernization commission, and in 1961 he was chosen as a member of the "1985 working group" of the Commissariat.

In 1948, Fourastié became vice president of the scientific and technical committee of the European Economic Cooperation Organization (predecessor of the OECD).  From 1954 to 1957, he led the European Coal and Steel Community's study group on the conditions and effects of technical progress in the steel industry.  In 1957 he was appointed as a United Nations expert for the Mexican government and to the economic commission for Latin America.

Fournastié was a professor at the Institut d'Etudes Politiques de Paris until his retirement in 1978.  He became professor (Directeur d'études) at the VIth section of the École Pratique des Hautes Études (later EHESS)  in 1951, and from 1960 he held the chair of Economics and Industrial Statistics at CNAM.

In 1966, Fourastié became a columnist for the daily newspaper Le Figaro. Until 1968 he presented the monthly program "Quart d'heure" ("quarter hour") on French state television.

In 1968, he was elected to the Académie des Sciences Morales et Politiques, and became its president in 1978. In 1981, he was named president of the central administrative commission of the Institut de France.

Publications
 Le Contrôle de l'État sur les sociétés d'assurances. Paris, Faculté de Droit, 1937, 275 p.
 Le Nouveau Régime juridique et technique de l'assurance en France. Paris, L'Argus, 1941, 282 p.
 La Comptabilité. Paris, Presses Universitaires de France, 1943, 128 p. Coll. Que sais-je?
 . Paris, Librairie générale de droit et de jurisprudence, 1944, 271 p.
 L'Économie française dans le monde, avec la collaboratioun de Henri Montet. Paris, Presses universitaires de France, 1945, 136 p., Coll. Que sais-je ? n° 191
 Les Assurances au point de vue économique et social. Paris, Payot, 1946, 132 p. (Bibliothèque économique).
 Esquisse d'une théorie générale de l'évolution économique contemporaine, Paris, Presses Universitaires de France, 1947, 32 p. 
 Note sur la philosophie des sciences, Paris, Presses Universitaires de France, 1948, 36 p. 
 Le Grand Espoir du XXe siècle. Progrès technique, progrès économique, progrès social. Paris, Presses Universitaires de France, 1949, 224 p. - Réed 1989 collection Tel Gallimard
 La Civilisation de 1960. Paris, Presses universitaires de France, 1947. 120 p. (Coll. Que sais-je ? n° 279). Ed. remaniée en 1953 sous le titre : La Civilisation de 1975, en 1974, sous le titre : La Civilisation de 1995 et en 1982 sous le titre : La Civilisation de 2001. 11e éd. : 1982.
 Le progrès technique et l'évolution économique, Institut d'Études Politiques de Paris, Paris, les cours de Droit (deux fascicules), 1951-52, 249 p.
 Machinisme et bien-être. Paris, Ed. de Minuit, 1951, 256 p. (Coll. l'Homme et la machine, dirigée par Georges Friedmann, n° 1), translated in English : The causes of wealth, The Free Press of Glencoe, Illinois, 1960.
 La Productivité Paris, Presses universitaires de France, 1952, 120 p. (Coll. Que sais-je ? n° 557). (11e éd. : 1987)
 La prévision économique et la direction des entreprises. Paris, Presses universitaires de France, 1955, 152 p. 
 Productivity, prices et wages, Paris, O.E.C.E., 1957, 115 p. 
 Pourquoi nous travaillons. Paris, Presses universitaires de France, 1959, 128 p. (Coll. Que sais-je ? n° 818). (8e éd. : 1984). (Traduit en espagnol, japonais, allemand, portugais, grec).
 La Grande Métamorphose du XXe siècle. Essais sur quelques problèmes de l'humanité d'aujourd'hui. Paris, Presses universitaires de France, 1961, 224 p. 
 La Planification économique en France, avec la collaboration de Jean-Paul Courthéoux. Paris, Presses universitaires de France, 1963, 208 p. (Coll. L'organisateur)
 Les Conditions de l'esprit scientifique. Paris, Gallimard, 1966, 256 p. (Coll. Idées n° 96). 
 Les 40 000 heures. Paris, Gonthier-Laffont, 1965. 247 p. (Coll. Inventaire de l'avenir n°1). 
 Essais de morale prospective. Paris, Gonthier ; 1966, 200 p. 
 Lettre ouverte à quatre milliards d'hommes. Paris, A. Michel, 1970, 167 p. (Coll. Lettre ouverte) 
 Prévision, futurologie, prospective, Cours de l'Institut d'Études Politiques de Paris. 1973-74. Paris, Les cours de droit, 1974, 113 p. (ronéoté).
  L'Église a-t-elle trahi ? Dialogue entre Jean Fourastié et René Laurentin. Paris, Beauchesne, 1974, 192 p. 
 Pouvoir d'achat, prix et salaires, avec la collaboration de Jacqueline Fourastié. Paris, Gallimard, 1977, 223 p. (Coll. Idées n° 374).
 La réalité économique. Vers la révision des idées dominantes en France, avec la collaboration de Jacqueline Fourastié, Paris, R. Laffont, 1978, 365 p. (Réédité en 1986, Paris, Hachette, 423 p. Coll. Pluriel n° 8488) .
 Les Trente Glorieuses, ou la révolution invisible de 1946 à 1975, Paris, Fayard, 1979, 300 p. (Rééd Hachette Pluriel n° 8363).
 Ce que je crois, Paris, Grasset, 1981.
 Le Rire, suite, Paris, Denoël-Gonthier, 1983
 Pourquoi les prix baissent, avec la collaboration de Béatrice Bazil, Paris, Hachette, 1984, 320 p. (Coll. Pluriel n° 8390).

See also
 Three-sector hypothesis

Notes and references 

The information on this page is partially translated from the equivalent page in French :fr:Jean Fourastié  licensed under the Creative Commons/Attribution Sharealike . History of contributions can be checked here:

External links 
 Comité Jean Fourastié 
 J. Fourastié (1994), Jean Fourastié entre Deux Mondes: Mémoires en Forme de Dialogues avec sa Fille Jacqueline (Posthumuous book in collaboration with J. Fourastié and B. Bazil), Beauchesne Edteur, Paris
 G.J. Hospers (2003), Fourastié’s foresight after fifty years, Foresight: The Journal of Future Studies, Strategic Thinking and Policy, 5 (2), pp. 11–14

1907 births
1990 deaths
People from Nièvre
French economists
Economic historians
École Centrale Paris alumni
Members of the Académie des sciences morales et politiques